Jerzy Melcer (born 10 March 1949 in Białystok) is a former Polish handball player who competed in the 1972 Summer Olympics and in the 1976 Summer Olympics.

In 1972 he was part of the Polish team which finished tenth.  He played all five matches and scored nineteen goals.

Four years later he won the bronze medal with the Polish team.  He played four matches and scored nine goals.

External links 
 profile 

1949 births
Living people
Polish male handball players
Handball players at the 1972 Summer Olympics
Handball players at the 1976 Summer Olympics
Olympic handball players of Poland
Olympic bronze medalists for Poland
Vive Kielce players
Olympic medalists in handball
Sportspeople from Białystok
Medalists at the 1976 Summer Olympics